Rangachahi College, established in 1983, is a general degree college situated at Rangachahi, in Majuli district, Assam. This college is affiliated with the Dibrugarh University.

Departments

Science
Physics
Mathematics
Chemistry
Botany
Zoology

Arts 
Assamese
English
History
Education
Economics
Sociology
Political Science

References

External links
http://www.rangachahicollege.com/

Universities and colleges in Assam
Colleges affiliated to Dibrugarh University
Educational institutions established in 1983
1983 establishments in Assam